Einir Jones (born 1950 in Anglesey) is a Welsh poet and adaptor of children's books.

In 1991, Jones won the Mold National Eisteddfod of Wales. She also worked as a judge at the Monmoutshire and District National Eisteddfod of Wales, 2016. She was educated at Bangor University and now lives in Ammanford, Carmarthenshire, with her husband the Rev. John Talfryn Jones, teaching at Amman Valley Comprehensive School.

Works

Her works include Daeth Awst Daeth Nos (Night came in August, Barddas Publications, 1991), Gweld y Garreg Ateb (View the Stone Solution, Gwynedd Press, 1991) and Rhwng Dau (Between Two, co-written with Edward Jones, Pantycelyn Press, 1998).

References

Living people
1950 births
20th-century Welsh poets
20th-century Welsh women writers
21st-century Welsh people
21st-century Welsh women
People from Anglesey
Welsh women poets
Alumni of Bangor University